State Highway 10 ( RJ SH 10) is a State Highway in Rajasthan state of India that connects Swaroopganj in Sirohi district of Rajasthan with Ratlam in Ratlam district of Madhya Pradesh. The total length of RJ SH 10 is 315 km. 

This highway connects National Highway 14 in Swaroopganj to National Highway 79 in Ratlam. Other cities and towns on this highway are: Khapan, Royada, Kotada, Babalwara,  Kherwara, Dungarpur, Sagwara, Garhi, Banswara, Danpur, Sarwan and Sailana.

References
 State Highway

Sirohi district
Transport in Udaipur district
Dungarpur district
Banswara district
State Highways in Rajasthan